The 2011–12 AL-Bank Ligaen season was the 55th season of ice hockey in Denmark. Nine teams participated in the league, and the Herning Blue Fox won the championship by defeating the Odense Bulldogs in the final.

Regular season

Playoffs

External links
 AL-Bank Ligaen official website

Dan
2011 in Danish sport
2012 in Danish sport